is a 1958 Japanese juvenile delinquent film directed by Seijun Suzuki for the Nikkatsu Corporation. Akira Kobayashi stars as a young hoodlum who tries to go straight after falling in love with his social worker.

Cast
 Yoshio Oomori as Kouzou Horie 
 Akira Kobayashi as Hiroshi Horie
 Misako Watanabe as Masako Horie
 Kotoe Hatsui as Tomiko Kozaki
 Hideaki Nitani as Tsuneo Takamura
 Shouichi Ozawa as Sukimoto
 Keisuke Noro as Chin Tooru

References

External links
 
 
 Young Breasts  at the Japanese Movie Database

1958 films
1950s Japanese-language films
1958 drama films
Films directed by Seijun Suzuki
Nikkatsu films
1950s Japanese films